Riad Yunes (born 14 September 1928) is a Dominican former sports shooter. He competed at the 1968 Summer Olympics and the 1972 Summer Olympics.

References

External links

1928 births
Possibly living people
Dominican Republic male sport shooters
Olympic shooters of the Dominican Republic
Shooters at the 1968 Summer Olympics
Shooters at the 1972 Summer Olympics
Sportspeople from Santo Domingo